Airiman were an Indigenous Australian tribe from Australia's Northern Territory.

Country
According to Norman Tindale, the Airiman's traditional lands encompassed . Baldwin Spencer encountered this tribe at the headwaters of the Fitzmaurice River. They were later described by D. S. Davidson who, Tindale claims, incorrectly took them to be Ngarinman.

Notes

Citations

Sources

Aboriginal peoples of the Northern Territory